Palaeoaplysina is a genus of tabular, calcified fossils that are a component of many Late Palaeozoic reefs.  The fossil acted as a baffle to trap sediment. Historically interpreted as a sponge or hydrozoan, recent studies are converging to its classification in the coralline stem group, placing it among the red algae.

Morphology 

The thalloid organism had a series of internal canals opening on one side of the body (presumably the upper side), and volcano-like protuberances on that same side inviting comparison to filter-feeding organisms.  On the other hand, it seems to have had a calcified cellular make up akin to that of the coralline reds, suggesting that it was either a stem-group coralline or a coralline-encrusted filter feeder.

Distribution 
The organism is widespread in the tropical and near-tropical margin of the Laurentian continent (45–15°N), but is not found elsewhere. Its oldest reported occurrence is Middle Pennsylvanian (mid- to late Moscovian) and youngest is the late Sakmarian. It acts as an important reservoir rock for oil deposits.

See also

References

Red algae genera
Fossil algae
Pennsylvanian first appearances
Cisuralian genus extinctions
Paleozoic life of Nunavut
Paleozoic life of Yukon